In enzymology, a tetrahydrofolate synthase is an enzyme that catalyzes the chemical reaction

ATP + tetrahydropteroyl-[gamma-Glu]n + L-glutamate  ADP + phosphate + tetrahydropteroyl-[gamma-Glu]n+1

The 3 substrates of this enzyme are ATP, [[tetrahydropteroyl-[gamma-Glu]n]], and L-glutamate, whereas its 3 products are ADP, phosphate, and [[tetrahydropteroyl-[gamma-Glu]n+1]].

This enzyme belongs to the family of ligases, specifically those forming carbon-nitrogen bonds as acid-D-amino-acid ligases (peptide synthases).  The systematic name of this enzyme class is tetrahydropteroyl-gamma-polyglutamate:L-glutamate gamma-ligase (ADP-forming).   This enzyme participates in folate biosynthesis.

Structural studies

References

 
 
 
 
 
 

EC 6.3.2
Enzymes of known structure